i 2 (EYE) is Michael W. Smith's fifth album overall and his second album to be certified gold. Smith collaborated again with lyricist Wayne Kirkpatrick, and produced a music video for the song "Secret Ambition". The album peaked at No. 1 on the Top Contemporary Christian charts.

Track listing 
All songs written by Michael W. Smith and Wayne Kirkpatrick except where noted.

Personnel 
Musicians

 Michael W. Smith – keyboards, lead vocals, backing vocals (2, 3, 6, 7, 10), horn arrangements (6), drum programming (9)
 Dann Huff – guitars (1–8)
 Chris Rodriguez – guitars (1, 3, 5, 6, 8), backing vocals (4, 6, 8, 11)
 Jerry McPherson – guitars (2, 4, 9, 10), acoustic guitar (7)
 Tom Hemby – guitars (6, 8, 10, 11), bass (9, 11)
 Mark O'Connor – mandolins (9), fiddles (9)
 Billy Sprague – acoustic guitar (11)
 Mike Brignardello – bass (1–5, 7, 8)
 Tommy Sims – bass (6)
 Gary Lunn – bass (10)
 Paul Leim – drums (1–4, 6, 7, 8, 10)
 Mark Hammond – drum programming (11)
 Terry McMillan – percussion (1, 3, 5, 7, 8), harmonica (1)
 String quartet (5)
 Ronn Huff – string arrangements
 Bob Mason – cello 
 George Binkley – violin 
 John Borg – violin 
 Carl Gorodetzsky – violin 
 Horns and horn arrangements (6)
 Mark Douthit – saxophones 
 Barry Green – trombone 
 Mike Haynes – trumpet 
 Wayne Kirkpatrick – backing vocals (1–8, 10), acoustic guitar (3), drum programming (9)
 Chris Harris – backing vocals (1, 2, 4, 5, 8, 10), recitation (6)
 Mark Heimmerman – backing vocals (2, 5)
 Oz Fox – backing vocals (4)
 Billy Simon – backing vocals (4)
 Michael Sweet – backing vocals (4)
 Chris Harris – choir on "The Throne"
 Jan Harris – choir on "The Throne"
 Amy Heimmerman – choir on "The Throne"
 Mark Heimmerman – choir on "The Throne"
 Chris Rodriguez – choir on "The Throne"
 Lisa Rodriguez – choir on "The Throne"
 Kim Smith – choir on "The Throne"
 Angel Palacastro – choir on "The Throne"
 Don Wise – choir on "The Throne"
 Anna Kristen Caker – children's choir on "The Throne"
 Benji Cowart – children's choir on "The Throne"
 Jeremy Cowart – children's choir on "The Throne"
 Dana Dawson – children's choir on "The Throne"
 Daniel Dorris – children's choir on "The Throne"
 Heather Holland – children's choir on "The Throne"
 Shannon Love – children's choir on "The Throne"
 Sara Yarborough – children's choir on "The Throne"
 Kathie Hill – children's choir director

Production

 Michael W. Smith – producer
 Wayne Kirkpatrick – producer
 Michael Blanton – executive producer
 Jeff Moseley – executive producer
 Bill Whittington – engineer, mixing
 Lynn Fuston – additional engineer
 Steve Bishir – assistant engineer
 John Bouchillon – assistant engineer
 Mike Clute – assistant engineer
 Brian Hardin – assistant engineer
 Mark Nevers – assistant engineer
 Dave Parker – assistant engineer
 Carry Summers – assistant engineer
 The Bennett House (Franklin, Tennessee) – recording location
 Deer Valley (Franklin, Tennessee) – recording location
 The Castle (Franklin, Tennessee) – recording location
 OmniSound (Nashville, Tennessee) – recording location
 Sixteenth Avenue Sound (Nashville, Tennessee) – recording location, mixing location
 Masterfonics (Nashville, Tennessee) – mixing location
 Ken Love – editing
 Hank Williams – mastering at MasterMix (Nashville, Tennessee)
 Jackson Design Nashville – design
 Eika Aoshima – photography
 Jonathan Scow-Cloutier – styling
 Wendy Osmundson – grooming

Chart performance

Weekly charts

Certifications

References 

Michael W. Smith albums
1988 albums
Reunion Records albums